The beach volleyball competition at the 2018 Central American and Caribbean Games was held in Barranquilla, Colombia from 28 July to 1 August at the Puerta de Oro Center.

Medal summary

Medal table

References

External links
2018 Central American and Caribbean Games – Beach volleyball

2018 Central American and Caribbean Games events
Central American and Caribbean Games
2018